The 1970 United States Senate election in West Virginia was held on November 3, 1970. Incumbent senator Robert Byrd won re-election by the biggest margin at that point in his career.

Background 
The election was held during the 1970 United States Senate elections. In the election Democrats maintained their majority, but lost seats.

Results

Democratic Primary

General Election

References 

United States Senate
1970
West Virginia
Robert Byrd